The 1979 LFF Lyga was the 58th season of the LFF Lyga football competition in Lithuania.  It was contested by 17 teams, and Atmosfera Mazeikiai won the championship.

League standings

References
RSSSF

LFF Lyga seasons
1979 in Lithuania
LFF